Whiston is a village in the Staffordshire Moorlands district of Staffordshire, England. Population details as taken at the 2011 census can be found under Kingsley.  It is located within the Churnet Valley on the A52 road east of the village of Froghall.

History
In 1769 the fifth Duke of Devonshire, William Cavendish, opened a new Lead and Copper smelting works, supplementing his mining works at nearby Ecton.

See also
Listed buildings in Kingsley, Staffordshire

Villages in Staffordshire
Towns and villages of the Peak District
Staffordshire Moorlands